Lactuca cypria, the Cyprus lettuce, is a biennial, erect herb with glandular, hairy stems and a globose rhizome. Leaves alternate, simple, the basal large, oblong, petiolate, 10-15 x 5–7 cm, pinnatisect with a suborbicular terminal lobe, the upper smaller, often with a profound purple colour at the lower surface. Flowers in heads, capitula in corymbs, florets pale yellow, all ligulate, flowers April–July, fruit a pappose achene.

Habitat
In moist, shaded positions, by streams and moist hillsides among pines  and riverine forest on igneous formations at 800–1950 m altitude.

Distribution
Endemic to Cyprus where it is confined to the Troödos Mountains where it in some areas is fairly common: Tripylos, Stavros Psokas, Kryos Potamos, Troödos Forest, Khionistra.

References

cyprica
Endemic flora of Cyprus
Plants described in 1951